The 2016–17 Arizona Wildcats women's basketball team represented University of Arizona during the 2016–17 NCAA Division I women's basketball season. The Wildcats, led by first-year head coach Adia Barnes, played their games at the McKale Center and were members of the Pac-12 Conference. They finished the season 14–16, 5–13 in Pac-12 play to finish in a 4 way ninth place. They lost in the first round of the Pac-12 women's basketball tournament to Oregon.

Roster

Schedule

|-
!colspan=9 style=| Exhibition

|-
!colspan=9 style=| Non-conference regular season

|-
!colspan=9 style=| Pac-12 regular season

|-
!colspan=9 style=|Pac-12 Women's Tournament

See also
2016–17 Arizona Wildcats men's basketball team

References

Arizona Wildcats women's basketball seasons
Arizona
Arizona Wildcats women's basketball
Arizona Wildcats women's basketball